Kritimys, also known as the Cretan giant rat is an extinct genus of murid rodent that was endemic to the island of Crete during the Pleistocene. There are two known species, K. kiridus from the Early-Mid Pleistocene, and its descendant K. catreus from the Middle Pleistocene. As with most island rodents, Kritimys was larger than its mainland relatives, with its size increasing over time. The temporal range of the genus is considered to define the regional Kritimys biozone. It is suggested to be closely related to and probably derived from Praomys.

References

Prehistoric rodent genera
Pleistocene rodents
Prehistoric Crete
Prehistoric mammals of Europe
Muridae